Veronica Pedrosa is a Filipino independent broadcast journalist, news presenter and moderator, based in London.

Career
Pedrosa began her career, in 1995, as a news anchor with CNN International and then with BBC World. She has also been a journalist with ABS-CBN News and Current Affairs.

Al Jazeera English 
Pedrosa was with Al Jazeera English in the run-up to its launch, and worked for the channel for six years full-time, from 2005 to 2011, and then as a freelance for a few years more. During that time she was based in the Asia-Pacific bureau, in Kuala Lumpur; at the main bureau, in Doha; and as a correspondent in the field, based primarily in Bangkok:

Kuala Lumpur 
Pedrosa was the lead news presenter at the Kuala Lumpur bureau throughout its life as a broadcast centre, from 2005 in the run-up to the station's launch, to the closure of the Malaysian broadcast centre, in 2010.

Doha
In 2013, she took a break from her work as a field journalist in the Far East to work as a relief news-anchor in Doha. Based at the main broadcast centre in Qatar, she presented news-bulletins on the flagship programme Newshour, but also appeared as the host of studio-based discussion programmes, such as the daily programme Inside Story, and the more specialist weekly, Inside Syria. She also hosted, from Indonesia, an edition of the extended-interview strand Talk to Al Jazeera.

Bangkok
In addition to her studio-work, Pedrosa was a respected field-correspondent for Al Jazeera English. As the Bangkok correspondent, she filed stories from Thailand and throughout the South-East Asia region. In November 2013, she returned to her homeland of the Philippines, to cover the aftermath of the super-typhoon.

Awards
In 2004, Pedrosa was named Best News Anchor at the Asian Television Awards.

Personal life
Family
Pedrosa is the daughter of Filipino journalist Carmen Navarro Pedrosa.

Mrs. Navarro Pedrosa wrote a critical biography of the then-First Lady Imelda Marcos, during the Martial Law Era in the Philippines. This risked retribution and political persecution by President Ferdinand Marcos and his regime, so the family decided to go into voluntary exile, in London.

Pedrosa was married from 1997 to 2017.

Education
Pedrosa was educated at St. Paul's Girls' School, in London, and at Newnham College, Cambridge. She graduated from Cambridge University in 1988, with an MA (Hons.) in English.

References

Living people
Year of birth missing (living people)
People educated at St Paul's Girls' School
Alumni of Newnham College, Cambridge
Filipino expatriates in the United Kingdom
Broadcast news analysts
Filipino television news anchors
CNN people
BBC News people
BBC newsreaders and journalists
ABS-CBN News and Current Affairs people
Al Jazeera people